Challenge One or variations, may refer to:

 Challenge-1, or Challenge One, a Tunisian satellite
 Challenge +1, a one hour timeshift simulcast of TV channel Challenge
 Challenge (2009 film), a Bengali film, which has a subsequent spin-off Challenge 2

See also

 The Challenge (disambiguation)
 Challenge (disambiguation)